Kaplinskaya is a rural locality (a village) in Verkhovskoye Rural Settlement, Tarnogsky District, Vologda Oblast, Russia. The population was 155 as of 2002.

Geography 
Kaplinskaya is located 33 km west of Tarnogsky Gorodok (the district's administrative centre) by road. Sverdlovskaya is the nearest rural locality.

References 

Rural localities in Tarnogsky District